Wayne Flynn (born ) is a former professional rugby league footballer who played in the 1990s and 2000s. He played at club level for Wakefield Trinity (Heritage № 1066), and the Sheffield Eagles.

Genealogical Information
Wayne Flynn is the younger brother of the rugby league footballer; Adrian Flynn.

References

External links
Eagles see off Leigh challenge
Leigh dominance continues

1974 births
Living people
English rugby league players
Place of birth missing (living people)
Rugby league centres
Rugby league locks
Rugby league wingers
Sheffield Eagles (1984) players
Sheffield Eagles players
Wakefield Trinity players